Allan Steele (born December 30, 1966) is an American actor and writer.  He is perhaps best known for playing Sergeant Harris in the film The Next Three Days, and for TV roles on The Black Donnellys, NYPD Blue, Family Law, Time of Your Life and Falcone.

In 2015, Steele appeared in the HBO mini-series Show Me A Hero, written by David Simon and Bill Zorzi, and directed by Academy Award winner Paul Haggis.  A true story, the series takes place in Yonkers, NY in the 1980s, when a federal court order forced Yonkers mayor Nick Wasicsko (Oscar Isaac) to build low-income housing in white neighborhoods, a decision that would ruin his political career and divide the city.  Steele plays Edward Fagan, one of the defiant members of the Yonkers city council.

Highlights as a television writer include an episode of the CBS drama Michael Hayes, co-written with John Romano and named a TV Guide “Editorʼs Choice”; an episode of CBSʼ Family Law co-written with Paul Haggis; an episode of the NBC show, The Black Donnellys, and in 2015, 100 Code, co-written with Robert Moresco.

Steele has written and directed three short films. The Syndicate, a comedy, received the Audience Award for Best Short Film at the Hamptons International Film Festival. The Fence, a drama, received an Honorable Mention at CineVegas.  And Vicʼs Café, a musical.

External links
Official Website

1966 births
Living people
People from Jericho, New York
American male film actors
American male television actors
University at Albany, SUNY alumni